Eslourenties-Daban is a commune in the Pyrénées-Atlantiques department and Nouvelle-Aquitaine region of south-western France.

Geography 
Eslourenties-Daban is located twenty kilometers east of Pau. The river Gabas, a tributary of the Adour, flows through the commune.

History 
Paul Raymond notes that in 1385, Eslourenties-Daban had seven fires and depended on the bailiwick of Pau. This commune was the chief town of the notairie des Lannes and Rivière-Ousse, then during the 18th century of the notairie des Lannes only. The remains of a fortified complex from the 11th century bear witness to the ancient past of the commune.

Intercommunality 
Eslourenties-Daban is part of four intermunicipal structures:

 The Community of Municipalities of Nord-Est Béarn;
 The school union of Eslourenties - Lourenties - Limendous;
 The energy syndicate of Pyrénées-Atlantiques;
 The intercommunal drinking water supply syndicate of Luy - Gabas - Lées.

Eslourenties-Daban is home to the headquarters of the Eslourenties-Lourenties-Limendous school union.

Demographics 

In 2018, the commune had 353 inhabitants.

Religious heritage 
The church of St. Martin dates from the 19th century. It contains furniture, a processional cross, a statue, and canopies, referenced in the general inventory of cultural heritage.

Environmental heritage 
The lake of Gabas, a 216ha lake is used for irrigation and is a support of low water level.

The commune also has an environmental pole for fishing intended for environmental education, and a Fishing and Nature House, with a showroom specially equipped for the handicapped. The Handi-fishing pole promotes the practice of leisure fishing for all publics and is specially equipped to welcome the disabled and has received the label Tourisme Handicap.

See also
Communes of the Pyrénées-Atlantiques department

References

Communes of Pyrénées-Atlantiques